Whitman D. (Whit) Tucker (born November 15, 1940) is a former professional Canadian football flanker in the Canadian Football League who played the entirety of his career with the Ottawa Rough Riders. He was a CFL-All Star in 1967 and won two Grey Cup championships with Ottawa in 1968 and 1969.

High school and college
Tucker was an all-star high school athlete in Windsor, Ontario.  He received a track scholarship to the University of Southern California upon graduation, but decided to attend the University of Western Ontario, where he was a three sport standout.

Professional career
Playing for the Ottawa Rough Riders from 1962 to 1970, Tucker was an Eastern All-Star three times, a CFL All-Star in 1967, won the Gruen Trophy as best rookie in the Eastern Conference in 1962, and was the Outstanding Canadian player in the East Division in 1968. He was a two-time Grey Cup champion after helping his team win the 56th Grey Cup in 1968 and the 57th Grey Cup in 1969. He also played in the 54th Grey Cup in 1966. He holds the CFL record for highest career average gain receiving with 22.4 yards per catch over his career with Ottawa.

He was inducted into the Canadian Football Hall of Fame in 1993.  He is also a member of the Windsor Sports Hall of Fame, the Ottawa Sports Hall of Fame, and the UWO Sports Hall of Fame.

Post-football
Tucker is currently an investment executive in Ottawa, Ontario.

References

External links
His 2 TD receptions in the 54th Grey Cup game in 1966
Canadian Football Hall of Fame member

Sportspeople from Windsor, Ontario
Ottawa Rough Riders players
Western Mustangs football players
Canadian Football Hall of Fame inductees
Canadian football wide receivers
Players of Canadian football from Ontario
1940 births
Living people
Canadian Football League Rookie of the Year Award winners